Muchea is a town in the Shire of Chittering, located  north north-east of Perth. Its postcode is 6501.
The town's name comes from the Aboriginal word "Muchela" which means in Nyoongar 'water hole', referring to the abundance of water in Muchea.

History 
The area was first surveyed as farmland in 1845 as part of a property to be owned by George Moore.
The opening of a railway siding in the area between 1892 and 1898 caused permanent structures to be built and by 1903 farmlots were surveyed close to the siding. The townsite was later gazetted in 1904.

In 1960, the Muchea Tracking Station was established about  SSW outside of town as part of NASA's Mercury project. In 1962, the first Australian to speak with a space traveller did so from the Muchea facility. The station was closed in 1964.

References

Towns in Western Australia